The 1992 Great American Bash was the fourth annual Great American Bash professional wrestling pay-per-view event produced by World Championship Wrestling (WCW), and the eighth annual Great American Bash event overall. The event took place on July 12, 1992, at the Albany Civic Center in Albany, Georgia. It was the last Great American Bash held until 1995.

Seven matches were contested at the event. The event featured a tag team tournament for the newly created NWA World Tag Team Championship. Miracle Violence Connection defeated Dustin Rhodes and Barry Windham in the finals to win the tournament and to be crowned the first champions. From this point onwards, the WCW and NWA World Tag Team Championships were considered to be unified and were defended together by Miracle Violence Connection and subsequent champions until WCW withdrew from the NWA in 1993. Aside from the tag team tournament, the WCW World Heavyweight Championship was also defended at the event. Sting defended the title against Big Van Vader. Vader defeated Sting to win the title.

Production

Background
The Great American Bash is a professional wrestling event established in 1985. It was first produced by the National Wrestling Alliance's (NWA) Jim Crockett Promotions (JCP) and aired on closed-circuit television before becoming a pay-per-view event in 1988; JCP was rebranded as World Championship Wrestling (WCW) later that same year. WCW then seceded from the NWA in 1991. The 1992 event was the fourth annual Great American Bash event promoted by WCW and eighth annual overall. The event took place on July 12, 1992, at the Albany Civic Center in Albany, Georgia.

Storylines
The event featured wrestlers from pre-existing scripted feuds and storylines. Wrestlers portrayed villains, heroes, or less distinguishable characters in the scripted events that built tension and culminated in a wrestling match or series of matches.

Aftermath
The 1992 Great American Bash was the final Great American Bash event held until the 1995 event.  The event launched the first NWA World Tag Team Championship recognized at the NWA level and those titles still exist currently.  From this point forward, the WCW and NWA World Tag Team titles were defended together until WCW seceded for good from the NWA in September, 1993.

Also at the event was the announcement of a tournament beginning on August 6, 1992 in Tokyo for the NWA World Heavyweight Championship. During the announcement, WCW Executive Vice President Bill Watts anticipated an eventual unification with the WCW World title though the titles remained separate entities during WCW’s relationship with the NWA. The unification didn’t occur until 1994 when the big gold belt shown in the segment represented the WCW International World Heavyweight Championship.

A rematch between Sting and Big Van Vader was scheduled on August 2 though Sting was injured so a drawing was held to determine a new contender for the WCW World title. Ron Simmons won that drawing and the championship. Vader regained the title on December 30. Sting would briefly take the title in March 1993 until Vader got it back again.

Results

Tournament bracket

 Shinya Hashimoto was substituting for the injured Akira Nogami.

References

External links
The Great American Bash 1992

1992
Professional wrestling in Georgia (U.S. state)
1992 in Georgia (U.S. state)
Events in Georgia (U.S. state)
July 1992 events in the United States
1992 World Championship Wrestling pay-per-view events